Rathmore is a small town in Kerry, Ireland, lying immediately west of the border with Cork. Rathmore is divided into two parts, one being the main commercial centre, and the other being the administrative centre where the schools and churches are located which is colloquially known as Rath Beg. It lies at the heart of the Sliabh Luachra area known for its traditional Irish music and culture. The local GAA club is Rathmore GAA. The SAG (social action group) is in Rathmore and helps the elderly in the area. The town host the farmer's market every Saturday in the community centre.

Rathmore is the birthplace of numerous Irish scholars, including:
Eoghan Rua O Súilleabháin (Irish poet), Aogan Ó Rathaille (Irish poet and writer), and Fr. Patrick Dineen (compiled the Irish-English Dictionary)

Rathmore also has a strong football tradition and are frequent contributors to The Kerry Inter County Team.  

Rathmore Community School is a large feeder school for the universities and other third-level institutions in Ireland particularly for University College Cork and the University of Limerick.

Transport
The Mallow–Tralee railway line passes through the town and offers frequent services to Cork, Dublin Heuston and Tralee via Killarney and Farranfore (for Kerry Airport) . It is particularly busy during the weekend and evenings and is the access point for all rail users in the surrounding environs. Rathmore railway station opened on 1 December 1854 and was closed for goods traffic on 3 November 1975,.

Bus Éireann also offers a service between Cork and Tralee via Rathmore.

See also
 List of towns and villages in Ireland

References

Towns and villages in County Kerry